Ward Hawkins (29 December 1912 – 22 December 1990) was an American author, who wrote from the 1940s through the 1980s. His later works seem to have been science fiction, but earlier he wrote serial stories for the Saturday Evening Post in the 1940s and 1950s. He often wrote with his brother John Hawkins, and the University of Oregon has a collection of their manuscripts. In the 1960s, the brothers were writing for television, notably as staff writers for Bonanza, and in the 1970s, John Hawkins was a producer and writer for Little House on the Prairie, while Ward was Story Editor and also contributed many teleplays for the program.

Filmography

Films

Television

Books
 Floods of Fear, 1956 (Filmed in 1959)
 A Girl, a Man, and a River by John Hawkins and Ward Hawkins, paperback 1957
Violent City by John and Ward Hawkins, Red Badge Mystery, 1957
 Kings Will Be Tyrants, 1959, paperback 1960
 The Damnation of John Doyle Lee, 1982
 Sword of Fire, 1985
 Red Flame Burning, 1985
 Blaze of Wrath, 1986
 Torch of Fear, 1987

References

External links
 
 

1912 births
1990 deaths
20th-century American novelists
American male novelists
American science fiction writers
American male short story writers
20th-century American short story writers
20th-century American male writers